Dyschirius obscurus is a species of ground beetle in the subfamily Scaritinae. It was described by Gyllenhaal in 1827.

References

obscurus
Beetles described in 1827